The 2005 AFL Women's National Championships took place in Melbourne, Victoria, Australia. The tournament began on 19 June and ended on 24 June 2006. The 2005 tournament was the 14th Championship, the previous one being held in Adelaide in 2004. The U19-vics of Victoria won the 2005 Championship, defeating Senior-vics of Victoria in the final. It was Victoria U19's 1st title.

Ladder
  Victoria-U19
  Victoria-Senior
  Western Australia
  Queensland
  Northern Territory
  Australian Capital Territory
  South Australia
  New South Wales
 Australian Defence Force

All-Australian Team
VIC U19: Karen Paxman, Moana Hope, Penny Cula-Reid, Daisy Pearce

ACT: Mel Backhouse, Alana Lowes, Allison Smith 

NT: Lisa Roberts, Natalie Wood, Kate Burke  

VIC: Debbie Lee, Shannon McFerran, Lilian Keung, Michelle Dench, Meg Hutchins, Liz Skinner

SA:  Mary Ryan 

WA:  Louise Knitter 

QLD: Katherine Pender, Joanne Butland 

NSW: Talei Owen, Stephanie Foster 

Coach: Ricky Dolliver

External links
National Results from the AFL site

2005
2005 in Australian rules football
AFL